Orientozeuzera aeglospila is a moth in the family Cossidae. It was described by Turner in 1915. It is found in Australia, where it has been recorded from Queensland.

The wingspan is about 30 mm. Adults are white with black spots on the thorax. There is a dorsal line of black marks along the abdomen. There are several grey spots on the forewings. The hindwings have black markings around the margins.

References

Natural History Museum Lepidoptera generic names catalog

Zeuzerinae
Moths described in 1915